Nicole Irving (born 14 June 1982) is an Australian swimmer.

Career
Irving first competed for Australia at the 2002 FINA World Swimming Championships (25 m) in Moscow where she finished 7th in the 50 metre butterfly in 26.94. At the 2002 Commonwealth Games in Manchester, Irving won silver in the 50 metre butterfly in 27.13 finishing behind fellow Australian Petria Thomas.

References

1982 births
Living people
Australian female butterfly swimmers
Commonwealth Games silver medallists for Australia
Swimmers at the 2002 Commonwealth Games
Commonwealth Games medallists in swimming
Place of birth missing (living people)
20th-century Australian women
21st-century Australian women
Medallists at the 2002 Commonwealth Games